Slobodan Drapić (born 28 February 1965) is a Serbian-Israeli football manager and former player. He is currently the manager of Ironi Kiryat Shmona.

Playing career
Drapić was born and grew up in Novi Sad, where he played for the local side FK Novi Sad for two years in the Yugoslav Second League. In 1988, he moved to play in Israel for Maccabi Netanya and made aliyah. On 23 November 1988, he was called up for the Israeli national team and won his one and only cap for the national side in a friendly game against Romania.

Drapić played with Netanya for seven years in the Liga Leumit until the club got relegated in the end of the 1994–95 season. The following season he moved to play for Beitar Tubruk, where he also retired as a player.

Coaching career
In a long coaching career in Israel he became the assistant coach with Maccabi Netanya, Tzafririm Holon and Maccabi Haifa. When Ronny Levy left Maccabi Haifa, he also wanted to leave the club. Partizan Belgrade offered him a job as a scout and coach assistant, but he refused the offer because he wanted to stay in Israel.

On 27 September 2010, Drapić signed a two-year contract as manager of Bnei Sakhnin.

In the second half of the 2011–12 season he worked for Partizan as the assistant coach of Avram Grant.

In June 2013 he became the manager of Beitar Tel Aviv Ramla. He worked as the manager of the club until 7 June 2015, when he signed a contract as the manager of Beitar Jerusalem. The following season he returned to his former club of Maccabi Netanya.

Personal life
Drapić is married to his Israeli wife Anita. They have four children; the youngest is Dolev, who is a professional basketball player in Barak Netanya.

Managerial stats

References

1965 births
Living people
Footballers from Novi Sad
Association football defenders
Serbian footballers
Yugoslav footballers
Israeli footballers
Serbian expatriate footballers
Israel international footballers
RFK Novi Sad 1921 players
Maccabi Netanya F.C. players
Beitar Nes Tubruk F.C. players
Israeli Premier League managers
Maccabi Netanya F.C. managers
Hapoel Kfar Saba F.C. managers
Maccabi Herzliya F.C. managers
Bnei Sakhnin F.C. managers
Beitar Tel Aviv Bat Yam F.C. managers
Beitar Jerusalem F.C. managers
Hapoel Ironi Kiryat Shmona F.C. managers
Hapoel Tel Aviv F.C. managers
FK Partizan non-playing staff
Naturalized citizens of Israel
Serbian emigrants to Israel
Israeli football managers